Obeidia is a genus of moths in the family Geometridae erected by Francis Walker in 1862.

Species
Obeidia aurantiaca (Alpheraky, 1892)
Obeidia diversicolor Warren, 1901
Obeidia epiphleba Wehrli, 1936
Obeidia fumosa Warren, 1893
Obeidia gigantearia Leech, 1897
Obeidia horishana Matsumura, 1931
Obeidia idaria (Oberthur, 1893)
Obeidia irregularis Wehrli, 1933
Obeidia leptosticta Wehrli, 1933
Obeidia lucifera Swinhoe, 1893
Obeidia millepunctata Warren, 1893
Obeidia postmarginata Wehrli, 1933
Obeidia rongaria (Oberthur, 1893)
Obeidia tigrata (Guenee, 1857)
Obeidia vagipardata Walker, 1862

References

Ennominae